was a Japanese sport shooter who competed in the 1976 Summer Olympics.

References

1932 births
2016 deaths
Japanese male sport shooters
Skeet shooters
Olympic shooters of Japan
Shooters at the 1976 Summer Olympics
20th-century Japanese people